The Wommen Viaduct is an arch bridge built between 1938 and 1940 near Wommen, Germany, as part of the Reichsautobahn system.  It is a 26.5 metres (87 ft) tall and 303.8 metres (997 ft) long motorway bridge on the Bundesautobahn 4. Because of World War II, it was left half-finished, and because of the German division the one completed side was closed until 1990. After German reunification, it was completed in 1993 with a new bridge for the second lane.

References

Buildings and structures in Hesse
Road bridges in Germany
Bridges completed in 1993
Viaducts in Germany